Operator Generator was an American stoner rock band from San Jose, California. They were formed in the late 1990s and released their first self-titled EP in the winter of 1999 under 12th Records. Over a year later they released their debut album titled Polar Fleet under Man's Ruin Records.

Discography

Self-titled EP, 2000 
Operator Generator (self-titled EP), 2000 (12th Records) 

Track listing

 "Arctic Quest"
 "Infinite loop"
 "Equinox Planetarium"

Three of the original recordings released prior to the co-ordinated KOZIK release on Man's Ruin Records
Operator Generator "Polar Fleet" in the year 2001.
(Recorded with their original drummer Anthony Lopus.)

Polar Fleet, 2001
(Full-length album)
Polar Fleet, 2001 (Man's Ruin Records) 

Track listing

 "Equinox Planetarium"
 "Polar Fleet"
 "Museum's Flight"
 "Atmospheric Insect/Launch"
 "Quaintance of Natherack"
 "Arctic Quest"
 "Infinite Loop"
 "Soil of Lavermore"

Polar Fleet, 2015 Re-Release
According to Joe Tucci, the bass player from the band, 2001's Polar Fleet will be remastered and re-released under Twin Earth Records with brand new artwork.

References

American stoner rock musical groups